Sport in Israel plays an important role in Israeli culture and is supported by the Ministry of Culture and Sport. The most popular sports in Israel have traditionally been Association football (mainly) and basketball (secondly) - with the first being considered the national sport - in both of which Israeli professional teams have been competitive internationally. Israel is an international center for Jewish sport around the world and since 1932 the Maccabiah Games, an Olympic-style event for Jewish athletes, is held in the country. Despite Israel's location in the Asian continent, the Israeli sports associations in various sports belong to the European associations due to the refusal of many Arab Asian countries to compete with Israeli athletes.

The government's support and budgeting of sports in Israel is relatively low in comparison to other western countries. However, many Israeli athletes and teams managed to gain international success. The Israeli national basketball team has won 2 gold medals in the Asian Games and 1 silver medal at the European Championship, and basketball club Maccabi Tel Aviv is considered one of the best teams in Europe with 6 European titles. The Israeli national football team has won the AFC Asian Cup and the Israel Davis Cup team reached the semifinal of the 2009 Davis Cup. At the Olympic Games, Israel has won 13 medals.

History
Jewish physical fitness was promoted in the 19th century by Max Nordau and his concept of Muscular Judaism. The Maccabiah Games, an Olympic-style event for Jewish athletes inaugurated in 1932 is held every fours years.

In 1964, Israel hosted and won the AFC Asian Cup. In 1970, the Israel national football team  qualified for the FIFA World Cup, which was considered a major achievement for Israeli football. Israel was excluded from the 1978 Asian Games due to Arab pressure.

Major sports

Football
 

Football (Hebrew : , Kaduregel) is the most popular sport in Israel. The sport is governed by Israel Football Association. It joined the Asian Football Confederation in 1954, but was expelled in 1974 due to political pressure from Arab and Muslim members in the context of the Arab–Israeli conflict. It was admitted to UEFA as an associate member in 1992 and as a full member in 1994, therefore their teams compete as part of Europe in all international competitions.

The matches that draw the largest crowds are those of the Israeli Premier League. In 1967, Hapoel Tel Aviv became the first club to win the Asian Club Championships. In the 2001–02 UEFA Cup Hapoel reached the quarter-finals after knocking out Chelsea, Lokomotiv Moscow and Parma.

Israeli teams were also qualified five times to the UEFA Champions League group stage, including Maccabi Haifa in the 2002–03 and 2009–10 seasons, Maccabi Tel Aviv in the 2004–05 and 2015–16 seasons and Hapoel Tel Aviv in the 2010–11 season.

The Israel national football team hosted and won the 1964 AFC Asian Cup and qualified for the 1970 FIFA World Cup, which was held in Mexico. Mordechai Spiegler scored in a 1–1 draw against Sweden. Israel's Olympic football team qualified for the 1968 Summer Olympics and the 1976 Summer Olympics both times reaching the quarter finals. Israel's highest FIFA ranking was 15th in November 2008.

Famous matches of the Israeli football team include the 3–2 win in France in the 1994 world championship qualifying games, which ended up disqualifying the French team from the championship in the United States, the defeat of Austria 5–0 in 1999 during Euro 2000 qualifications, and a 2–1 win over Argentina in a friendly match in 1998, a game played in Teddy Stadium in Jerusalem.

Successful Israeli players who also played outside Israel include Eli Ohana, Giora Spiegel, Ronny Rosenthal, Avi Cohen, Eyal Berkovich, Haim Revivo, Dudu Aouate and Yossi Benayoun.

Notable Israeli players have included:
 Dudu Aouate, Israel, goalkeeper (RCD Mallorca & national team)
 Tal Ben Haim, Israel, center back/right back (Chelsea, Manchester City & national team captain)
 Yossi Benayoun, Israel, attacking midfielder (Chelsea, Liverpool, West Ham & national team captain)
 Eyal Berkovic, Israel, midfielder (West Ham, Celtic F.C., Manchester City national team)
 Avi Cohen, Israel, defender (Liverpool, Rangers, Maccabi Tel Aviv & national team)
 Yaniv Katan, Israel, forward/winger (Maccabi Haifa & national team)
 Eli Ohana, Israel, won UEFA Cup Winners' Cup and Bravo Award (most outstanding young player in Europe); national team; manager
 Haim Revivo, Israel, attacking/side midfielder (Celta Vigo, Fenerbahçe  & national team)
 Ronnie Rosenthal, Israel, left winger/striker (Liverpool, Tottenham & national team)
 Giora Spiegel, Israel, Midfielder (Israel national team)
 Mordechai Spiegler, Soviet Union/Israel, striker (Israel national team), manager
 Yochanan Vollach, Israel, defender (Maccabi Haifa & Israel national team)

Basketball

Basketball (כדורסל, Kadursal) is the second most popular sport in Israel. Hapoel Jerusalem, Hapoel Tel Aviv and Maccabi Tel Aviv dominate the domestic league and are among the top teams in Europe. Maccabi Tel Aviv has won the European championship 6 times, in 1977, 1981, 2001, 2004, 2005 and 2014. Hapoel Jerusalem won the Eurocup in 2004.

The Israel national basketball team has participated 23 times in the European Championship. Their best achievements were a silver medal in Eurobasket 1979, and 5th place in 1953 and 1977. The national team also played in two World Championships and once in the Summer Olympic Games.

Israeli basketball is known for its national under-20 team, winning silver medals twice, in 2000 FIBA Europe Under-20 Championship and 2004, and finishing 4th twice (1994, 2005), 5th (1992), and 6th (2007).
Israel U-20 also took place in the U-21 World Championship, finishing twice in 7th place (2001,2005), and 6th place (1993).

The renowned "Israeli coaching school" produced many of the most successful European basketball coaches, such as Ralph Klein, Pini Gershon, David Blatt, and Zvi Sherf.

Israeli player Omri Casspi previously played in the NBA. Gal Mekel, previously played in the NBA and Shay Doron previously played in the WNBA. David Blatt coached the NBA Cleveland Cavaliers. Other notable Israeli basketball players have included:

 Moshe "Miki" Berkovich, Israel, Euroleague, 6'4" shooting guard
 Oded Katash, Israel, Euroleague, 6'4" shooting guard
 Doron Sheffer, Israel,NCAA, Euroleague, 6'5" point guard
 Nadav Henefeld, Israel, NCAA, Eurolegue, 6'7 power forward
 Tal Brody, US & Israel, Euroleague 6' 2" shooting guard
 Lior Eliyahu, Israel, 6' 9" power forward, NBA draft 2006 (Orlando Magic; traded to Houston Rockets), playing in the Euroleague
 Yotam Halperin, Israel, 6' 5" guard, drafted in 2006 NBA draft by Seattle SuperSonics
 Omri Casspi, Israel, 6' 9" power forward, drafted in 2009 NBA draft by Sacramento Kings
 Gal Mekel, Israel, 6' 3" guard, drafted in 2009 NBA draft by Dallas Mavericks
 Deni Avdija, Israel, 6' 9" power forward, drafted in 2019 NBA draft by Washington Wizards

Baseball

Baseball was first introduced into the region on July 4, 1927, when baseball equipment was distributed at the Sephardic Orphanage in Jerusalem.

The Israel Baseball League, managed by Larry Baras, was established in 2007. It was the first professional baseball league in the Middle East. In its first and only season it had six teams that played in three stadiums. The first and only champions were the Bet Shemesh Blue Sox managed by Ron Blomberg.

The Israel national baseball team applied, unsuccessfully, to participate in the 2009 World Baseball Classic.  They were subsequently invited to participate in the newly created qualifying round of the 2013 World Baseball Classic. During the 2017 World Baseball Classic qualifier Israel qualified for the main tournament and finished in sixth place.

Team Israel won the 2019 European Baseball Championship - B-Pool in early July 2019 in Blagoevgrad, Bulgaria, winning all five of its games. It thus advanced to the playoffs against Team Lithuania in the 2019 Playoff Series at the end of July 2019 for the last qualifying spot for the 2019 European Baseball Championship. Israel won the best-of-three playoff series 2–0, and thereby qualified for the 2019 European Baseball Championship.

In Round 1 of the 2019 European Baseball Championship, Israel went 4–1. The team thereby advanced to the Championship's eight-team playoffs. In the Championship playoffs, Israel defeated Team France in the quarterfinals, lost to Team Italy in the semi-finals, and came in fourth.

Because Team Israel finished in the top five in the 2019 European Baseball Championship, it earned the right to participate in the 2020 Olympics qualifiers Africa/Europe Qualifying Event. As the winner of that tournament it qualified to be one of the six national teams that competed at the 2020 Summer Olympics in Tokyo.

Every member of the 24-member Team Israel that competed to qualify in the Olympics was Israeli, with four of the players native-born. The others made aliyah to Israel, under Israel's Law of Return, which gives anyone with a Jewish parent or grandparent or who is married to a Jew the right to return to Israel and be granted Israeli citizenship.

Chess

While chess, as an intellectual sport, has always been played in Israel, the arrival of large numbers of Jewish immigrants from the former Soviet Union in the 1990s brought many chess grandmasters to Israel and increased interest in the game. Boris Gelfand is the 2009 World Cup winner.

Swimming

Israel Swimming Association is the major swimming federation in Israel.  Swimming is popular in Israel's many beaches along the Mediterranean coast, the Sea of Galilee, in the Red Sea at the shores of Eilat, in the Dead Sea and in swimming pools. Famous Israeli swimmers include Eithan Urbach, Michael Halika, Gal Nevo, Yoav Gath, Yoav Bruck, Vered Borochovski, Amit Ivry, and Anna Gostomelsky.  At the 1996 Summer Olympics in Atlanta, Israel's team qualified to the final of the prestigious Men's 4 x 100 metre medley relay. Uri Bergman won 12 gold medals at the Paralympic Games, and other paralympic swimmers such as Izhak Mamistvalov and Keren Leibovitch won several gold medals as well.

The country's first swimming pool was built in 1933 as part of the Jerusalem YMCA. The first regulation-size swimming pool was built in 1935, just before the second Maccabiah, in Bat Galim.

Rowing

Rowing is a growing sport in Israel, and has seen a major breakthrough in recent years. Dani Fridman, Israel Champion, is currently ranked 10th in the world, and Moran Samuel is Israel's 1st rowing world champion (paralympic). Samuel, won her first Paralympic bronze medal, after coming 3rd at the Rio 2016 Summer Paralympics. Other Rio 2016 participants are Yulia Chernoy and Reuven Magnagey, who rowed together in a double scull boat and finished 9th.

The Daniel Rowing Centre in Tel Aviv is Israel's prime training facility, and the home of the national Olympic and Paralympic squad. The sport is practiced in Tel Aviv Yarkon River, Kishon Port of Haifa and Tiberius Sea of Galilee.

Other prominent athletes are Oleg Gonorovski, Tomer Shvartsman, Roni Iuster and Diana Egerton-Warburton.

The Israeli Rowing Federation is an active member of the International Rowing Federation – FISA.

Tennis

Highly ranked players include Shlomo Glickstein (world ranked #22 at his peak), Amos Mansdorf (ranked #18 at his best), Dudi Sela (ranked #29 at his best), Anna Smashnova (ranked #15 at her best), Shahar Pe'er (ranked #11 at her best) as well as the doubles team of Andy Ram and Jonathan Erlich (world #5 team in 2006 and 2008 Australian Open champions) - all of whom have trained at the Israel Tennis Centers. Since 2008, both men's and the women's teams have qualified for the top groups in the world - the men are in the Davis Cup world group, and the women are in the Fed Cup world group I. In December 2012, 12-year-old Yshai Oliel of Ramla, Israel, won the 51st Junior Orange Bowl International Tennis Championship for his age group.

Track and field

Track and field athletics in Israel are mainly focused around the Maccabiah Games and the international Olympic Games, where Israel has achieved notable successes during its short history. The Soviet-born Aleksandr Averbukh was the most successful Israeli track and field athlete, having won three gold medals in the pole vault at European championships (2000 — indoor, 2002 and 2006) as well as two medals at the World championships (1999 and 2001).

On August 5, 2022, Israeli-born Blessing Afrifah won the gold medal in the 200 meter  race at the World Athletics U20 Championships.

Marathons

Long-distance running is popular in Israel. The Tiberias Marathon , Tel Aviv Marathon, and the Jerusalem Marathon take place annually in January, February, and March respectively. Another half marathon is held annually at Ein Gedi, near the Dead Sea. There are various other shorter distance races over the course of the year through very different regions and terrains.

Minor sports

American football

The center of American football in Israel is the Kraft Family Stadium in Jerusalem. Currently, there are 4 leagues playing Flag Football. The WAFI which has 13 teams: high school level which has 12 teams and a youth team, all under the association of The AFI. There're also 3 leagues playing tackle-football: a junior high football league (which has donated equipment), a high school league - IHFL and an adult's league - IFL (Israeli Football League). The IFL has 11 teams coming from Jerusalem, Petah Tikva, Tel Aviv, Haifa, Beersheba and Ramat HaSharon. The game is mainly played by ex-pats from America, South Africa, England and France. The largest league in 2007 was men's contact who competed in the annual Holyland Bowl championship. Some 1000 players are involved in weekly football activities.

In 2015 the Israel national American football team had their first international game, in the qualifier for the European Championship.

Boxing

In Israel, boxing is not just a sport but an educational vehicle for helping young people overcome prejudices. The Israel Boxing Association (IBA) operates certified gyms in cities throughout the country, with 1,800 active members from Arab villages and Ethiopian and Russian immigrant population centers. Boxers as young as 11 train and participate in matches organized by the association. Israeli Yuri Foreman is a former World Boxing Association super welterweight champion. Roman Greenberg is currently International Boxing Organization's (IBO's) Intercontinental heavyweight champion. Hagar Finer is the WIBF champion bantamweight.

Adi Rotem of Tel Aviv is the current world champion in Thai boxing in the under-52 kilogram class. Ilya Grad is considered one of the eight best amateur Thai boxers in the world. In February 2012, Grad won the WCK international title in China and was permitted to enter Malaysia, which has no diplomatic relations with Israel, on an Israeli passport. Ido Pariente is an Israel lightweight Pankration World Champion.

Canoeing
Michael Kolganov, a Soviet (Uzbek)-born Israeli sprint canoer, has been a world champion and won an Olympic bronze in the K-1 500-meter.

Cricket
Israel became an associate member of the ICC in 1974. Israel competed in the 1979 ICC Trophy, the inaugural edition of what is now the Cricket World Cup Qualifier, but failed to get past the first round. They also failed to progress beyond the first round in the 1982 and 1986 tournaments.
They reached the plate competition of the ICC Trophy in 1990 and 1994 and in 1996 competed in their first European Championship in Denmark, finishing eighth in the eight team tournament.

In the 1997 ICC Trophy in Malaysia, they faced political demonstrations throughout the tournament from the Islamic Party of Malaysia. They were the first Israeli sports team to play in the country and finished in 21st place.

In 1998, they finished ninth in the European Championship ahead of only Gibraltar and the following year travelled to Gibraltar to take part in a quadrangular tournament also involving France and Italy.

Israel have been playing in Division Two of the European Championships since 2000, finishing fifth in 2000, fourth in 2002, sixth in 2004 and seventh in 2006.

In November 2007, Israel were defeated in a relegation match against Croatia, in the first international cricket game played in Israel. The loss meant that they were relegated from Europe Division Two to Europe Division Three. In 2009 they were re-promoted to second division with a win over Croatia.

At the 2016 ICC Europe Division Two tournament Israel finished fourth, behind Germany, Sweden, and Spain

There is a night cricket league playing a modified form of indoor cricket.

Curling

Israel national men's curling team has been competing as part of the European playdowns since 2014.  Israel has sent teams to the world mixed, world mixed doubles and world men's seniors competitions as well.

Equestrian

Notable Israeli equestrians include:

 Daniel Bluman (born 1990), Colombian-born Israeli Olympic show jumping rider

Fencing

Notable Israeli fencers have included:

 Boaz Ellis (foil), 5x Israeli champion
 Delila Hatuel (foil), Olympian, ranked # 9 in world
 Lydia Hatuel-Czuckermann (foil), 20x Israeli champion
 Noam Mills (épée), female Olympic fencer, junior world champion.
 Ayelet Ohayon (foil), European champion
 Andre Spitzer; killed by terrorists

Figure skating

Israel has one regulation ice rink, located in Metulla, a city on the Lebanese border. Israel has been sending teams to the Winter Olympics since 1994. In 2002, Galit Chait (world championship bronze medalist) and Sergei Sakhnovski (world championship bronze medalist) finished sixth in ice dancing. Alexandra Zaretski, Belarusian-born Israeli, ice dancer, Olympian, and Roman Zaretski, Belarusian-born Israeli, ice dancer, Olympian a brother and sister ice-dancing pair, came in ninth in the 2008 world championships and first in the 2009 World University Games.

Other notable Israeli skaters include:

  Alexei Beletski, Ukrainian-born Israeli, ice dancer, Olympian
 Natalia Gudina, Ukrainian-born Israeli, figure skater, Olympian
 Tamar Katz, US-born Israeli, figure skater
 Lionel Rumi, Israel, ice dancer
 Michael Shmerkin, Soviet-born Israeli, figure skater

Golf

Israel has a single 18-hole golf course named Caesarea Golf & Country Club and located in the town of Caesarea and a smaller 9 hole course called Gaash Golf Club located at kibbutz Ga'ash. Notable Israeli golfers include Rami Asayag, Asher Iyasu and world blind golfing champion Zohar Sharon. Laetitia Beck has won the Israeli Championship five times, including for the first time when she was 12 years of age, and won gold medals in golf in both the 2009 and 2013 Maccabiah Games, and is the first Israeli to compete in an LPGA Tour tournament.

Gymnastics

Israeli gymnast Neta Rivkin won a silver medal in the Rhythmic Gymnastics European Championships held in Minsk in 2011, to become the first gymnast of the country to win a medal at the European Championships. Rivkin also won the first world medal for Israel in rhythmic gymnastics at the World Rhythmic Gymnastics Championships held in Montpellier, France in 2011, and she won the bronze medal at the hoop final. The Israeli rhythmic gymnastic group also won the bronze medal at the event final of 3 ribbons and 2 hoops at the World Championships in Montpellier.

Linoy Ashram became the first Israeli rhythmic gymnast to win an individual all-around medal at the 2017 World Championships. She is the most decorated Israeli rhythmic gymnast, with 6 silver and 5 bronze medals at the World Championships (2017, 2018, 2019), 2 bronze medals at the 2017 European Championships and 2 gold and 2 silver medals at the 2019 European Games and recently at the 2020 European Championships, she won the gold medal in the Individual All-Around Event making her the first Israeli to win an All Around gold medal in the European Championships.

In 2013, Alexander Shatilov won a gold medal at the European championship in gymnastics in Moscow, Russia. In 2017, Artem Dolgopyat, an Israeli artistic gymnast, won a silver medal at the World Championships. In 2021, Artem Dolgopyat, an Israeli artistic gymnast, won a gold medal at the 2020 Summer Olympics.

Handball
Israel's national handball team participated in the 2002 European Men's Handball Championship in Sweden. Local power Hapoel Rishon Lezion qualified for the quarterfinals of the EHF Champions League in 2000.

Ice hockey

Ice hockey started in Israel in 1986 when the first rink opened in Kiryat Motzkin. Israel has a following of over 1,000 ice hockey players. Israel took part in the 2007 Ice Hockey Division II World Championships.

Notable players have included:

 Eliezer Sherbatov, Israel, left wing (Israel national ice hockey team)
 Max Birbraer, Russian from Kazakhstan; lived & played in Israel; 1st Israeli drafted by NHL team (New Jersey Devils)
 Oren Eizenman (Israel national team)

Lacrosse

Lacrosse is the country's fastest growing sport.

The Israel men's national lacrosse team has competed in the European Lacrosse Championships in 2012 finishing in 8th place, and in 2016 finished 2nd. Additionally they finished 7th at the World Lacrosse Championship in 2014.

Domestically, there are two men's clubs and one women's club that operate within Israel.

Martial arts

Capoeira clubs operate in various locations in Israel.
Krav Maga is taught to most citizens in the army, and practiced recreationally throughout the country. The Association of Martial Arts in Israel is chaired by Hamad Amar, an Israeli Druze member of the Knesset. Nili Block is a world champion kickboxer and Muay Thai fighter. Yulia Sachkov is a world champion kickboxer.

Judo is one of the five sports in which Israeli athletes have won Olympic medals. It is the most successful Israeli sport at the Olympics  providing five of the nine Olympic medals Israel has won. In 2013, Yarden Gerbi won a gold medal at the Judo World Championships, and in 2016 she won a bronze medal at the Olympics.  Other notable Israeli judokas include:

 Yael Arad, Israel, Olympic silver (light-middleweight)
 Daniela Krukower, Israel/Argentina, world champion (under 63 kg)
Sagi Muki, Israel, World Judo Championships gold (half-middleweight) 
Alice Schlesinger, Israel, World Judo Championships bronze;  European junior champion (under 63 kg) 
 Oren Smadja, Israel, Olympic bronze (lightweight)
 Ehud Vaks, Israel, (half-lightweight)
 Arik Ze'evi, Israel, Olympic bronze (100 kg)

Motorsport

The Israel Motor-Sport Association was founded in 1990. It has organised rally, autocross, rallycross and drag racing competitions.

Auto racing was legalized in 2011. A 1.5 km permanent racetrack was opened in Port of Eilat, where Formula Israel competitions are held.

Notable Israeli drivers include Chanoch Nissany (Formula One test-driver), Roy Nissany and Alon Day.

Netball
Netball was introduced in Israel in 1999 by Jodi Carreira. Today there are clubs in Raanana, Modi'in, Jerusalem, Kfar Etzion and Tel Aviv, all of which have teams participating in the Israel National Netball League. Israel Netball has sent senior and junior teams to international events, culminating in its first international win in Ireland in June 2008. The netball tournament of the Maccabiah has been hosted by Israel Netball since 2001. Currently ranked 36, Israel is a member of the International Netball Federation (INF) and of Netball Europe (NE).

Rugby

Rugby union is a minor sport brought to the country by British soldiers during the Mandate era. The first game post-independence was in 1951, organized by Leo Camron. A wave of immigration from English speaking countries, and France, since 1967 renewed interest in the sport, particularly in areas with large English-speaking populations such as Ra'anana and Jerusalem. A national league was set up in 1972, and the Israel Rugby Union (now Rugby Israel) formed in 1975. Israel's first international match was away to Switzerland on 25 May 1981, and ended 9–9. The Israel Union joined the International Rugby Board in 1988. Rugby union has also featured at the Maccabiah Games since 1981. Israel has entered the Rugby World Cup Sevens.

The women's rugby league in Israel consists of two teams in Tel Aviv, two in Haifa and one each in Jerusalem, Galilee and Ra’anana. An eighth club is scheduled to open in Beersheba in October 2019.

Kibbutz Yizre'el has been a big centre of Rugby in Israel after a group of South African Olim made a push to make the game bigger in the country.

Softball
The Israel Softball Association (fastpitch) was established in 1979 by a group of immigrants from North and South America. The Israel Softball Association is a registered Non Profit Organization which is recognized by the Sports Authorities in Israel and is a member of "Ayelet" - the Israeli Association of Non-Olympic Competitive Sports.
The activities conducted by the Israel Softball Association have assisted in the social integration of immigrants countrywide, and today its members also include many native Israelis.
The Association consists of 10 men's teams Divided into A Pool and B Pool, 3 women's teams,21 junior boys teams and 4 junior girls teams.
The Israeli National Teams represent the country in European Championships and other International Competitions.

Water Polo
Both men and women competed at the 2022 European Championships. By virture of its performance at the 2022 European Championships, the women's side qualified for the 2023 World Championships, being the first time the team will compete in this tournament.  Israel will host the 2024 European Championships.

Windsurfing

Israeli windsurfer Gal Fridman won two Olympic medals, gold and bronze, and was inducted into the International Jewish Sports Hall of Fame. Israeli windsurfer Shahar Tzuberi won a bronze medal at the 2008 Olympic Games in Beijing. In March 2012, Israeli windsurfer Lee Korzits won the women's RS-X title in the Sailing World Championships for the third time in a row. Israeli windsurfer Katy Spychakov won a silver medal in the Women's 2019 RS:X World Championships, and was an U21 winner in the Women's 2019 RS:X World Championships.

Wrestling
Seven Israeli wrestlers competed at the 2010 Senior European Championship in Baku. Four were Greco-Roman wrestlers while the others were freestyle. Gotsha Tzitziashvily competed at the Summer Olympics in Athens. He held the world championship title in the 84-kilogram weight class in 2003.

Underwater sports

Stand Up Paddle Boarding
Stand Up Paddle boarding or SUP is becoming increasingly popular in Israel.  A very accessible lifestyle sport on flat water there are many expeditions available such as the '4 Seas in 4 days'.  SUP Surfing is also very popular in Israel and it can offer some world class conditions.

Maccabiah Games
The Maccabiah Games are an international Jewish athletic event, similar to the Olympics, held every four years in Israel. The first games were held in 1932.

Boycotts and violence against Israeli sportsmen

Israeli athletes and teams are barred from some competitions. In addition, in many worldwide competitions, such as the Olympics, some Arab and Muslim competitors avoid competing against Israelis. Some countries even force their athletes not to compete against Israelis or in Israel. Mushir Salem Jawher, a Kenyan-born marathoner, lost his Bahraini citizenship after competing in the Kinneret Marathon in Israel.

Integration of Arab citizens in sports
Despite the country's political problems, Arab sportsmen have always been full participants in Israeli sports teams, contributing to Israel's success in the international arena, also playing in the Israel national football team. They include Rifat (Jimmy) Turk, Najwan Ghrayib, Walid Badir, Salim Toama, Abbas Suan and more. Another Israeli Arab, Johar Abu Lashin, born in Nazareth, was an IBO Welterweight champion.

Olympic Games

Israel has won thirteen Olympic medals. Gal Fridman won Israel's first Olympic gold medal at the 2004 Summer Olympics.

Sports media 

Television, radio, newspapers and news web sites discuss Israeli sports.
In 2010, Israel sports radio, the country's first English-language all-sports talk radio station, was established, covering Israeli and American sports.

The main football leagues air on Sport 1, Sport 2 (both owned by Charlton Broadcasting Company) and Sport 5. Other sports channels include Eurosport and Fox Sports.

Facebook page, Follow Team Israel, shares the news of Israeli sport to the world.

See also
List of Jews in sports
Krav maga
Hapoel
Maccabi World Union

References

External links
Follow Team Israel - Sharing the stories of Israeli sport to the world
TourTheIsrael - Israel bike racing organization
The Israel Football Association
Israel Basketball Association 
Sports Associations in Israel
Sports in Israel - Photos by Lev Borodulin
Sports in Israel - photos by Lev Borodulin
Sport: Yishuv to the Present
Israel Netball
Stand up paddle boarding in Israel

 
Sport in Asia